Edmond Fitzmaurice may refer to:
 Edmond Fitzmaurice, 1st Baron Fitzmaurice, British politician
 Edmond John Fitzmaurice, Roman Catholic bishop of Wilmington